"Tannerellaceae"  is a family of bacteria.

References

Bacteroidia
Bacteria genera